Dionysis Chasiotis (born 1 March 1975) is a Greek former footballer who played as a defender.

Career
Born in Katerini, Chasiotis began his professional football career by joining local side Pierikos F.C. in July 1994. He later played for PAOK F.C. in the Greek Super League and Kastoria F.C. in the Football League (Greece).

Honours

Club
PAOK
Greek Cup: 2000–01, 2002–03

References

External links
Profile at Onsports.gr

1975 births
Living people
Footballers from Katerini
Greek footballers
Pierikos F.C. players
PAOK FC players
Kastoria F.C. players
Agrotikos Asteras F.C. players
Iraklis Thessaloniki F.C. players
Association football defenders
Super League Greece players